There are approximately 25 current toll roads in the state of Texas. Toll roads are more common in Texas than in many other U.S. states, since the relatively low revenues from the state's gasoline tax limits highway planners' means to fund the construction and operation of highways.

Background
Toll roads, sometimes are seen as a recent addition to travel options for commuters.  However, this is not the case.  In fact the need for, use of, and discussion of toll roads can be traced back to 1939. According to Richard Weingroff at the Federal Highway Administration:
In the 1939 report to Congress, Toll Roads and Free Roads, the U.S. Bureau of Public Roads (BPR) rejected the toll option for financing Interstate construction because most Interstate corridors would not generate enough toll revenue to retire the bonds that would be issued to finance them. In part, the report attributed this conclusion to "the traffic-repelling tendency of the proposed toll-road system." Although some corridors had enough traffic to support bond financing, the report predicted that motorists would stay on the parallel toll-free roads to a large extent. That conclusion was called into question when the first segment of the Pennsylvania Turnpike, from Carlisle to Irwin, opened on October 1, 1940. It was an instant financial success. Following World War II, the turnpike's continued success prompted other States to use the same financing method. Each State established a toll authority to issue bonds. Revenue from the bonds provided the funds, up front, to pay for construction. Toll revenue allowed the toll authority to repay bond holders with interest and finance administration, maintenance, and operation of the highway.

The use of this toll system is related to the state of Texas as one might infer.  For the state of Texas, and more specifically Central Texas has seen a significant growth in recent years.  The United States Census Bureau reports that in 2010 Texas had a population just over 25 million citizens.  It is estimated that the population grew over five percent in just three years to nearly 26.5 million people.  This growth is great for the state of Texas, but has exposed an area of concern.  This area of concern is the infrastructure; specifically the lack of thoroughfares that can effectively move the increased vehicle traffic. An answer that that has been provided to address this concern is the implementation of toll roads.  While not a recent phenomena toll road construction is more prevalent now than in recent years.

The toll roads in Central Texas are governed through the Central Texas Regional Mobility Authority (CTRMA), which is stated to be the creating agency for transportation models to keep up with today's population growth. to promote future road construction which is to alleviate traffic issues within Travis and Williamson Counties  Texas is one of few states that has allowed private toll roads.

The idea that toll roads should be privatized, is an idea that stemmed from European models that are evident in Spain, Italy, and England. The European model is called build-operate-transfer (BOT), which is simply a public–private ownership of a roadway (toll road). The idea of a BOT is that a private company will fund, design and construct the planned toll roads and will operate them at the beginning of a project until their contract is fulfilled with a government, in which at the end of the contract the toll road will go under the ownership of...[such] government.   Despite the fact for which the CTRMA stands for or wishes to promote, there are many opposers to the expansion of toll roads within Central Texas.

Opinions

A reason in favor of toll roads mentioned in The Texas Tribune was, "that tolls: are "vital" to the state's future mobility planning as Texas tries to close the gap on road funding shortfall.  The article explains how the gas tax (38.4 cents per gallon of gas) hasn't been increased since 1993 and costs of building roadways has increased throughout time supporting the construction of toll roads.

A reason against one of the Central Texas toll projects is that the company that runs the SH 130 toll road has been said by Moody's business rating to have the possibility of defaulting on its debt in 2014 therefore Moody's lowered the business rating to B1. A B1 classification "indicates that the business is pretty risky to lend money to". The sponsors of the toll road are Zachary (a San Antonio, Texas based company), which sponsored 65%, and Cintra (a company based out of Spain) that sponsored 35%.  The lenders to the project: TIFIA program under the Federal Highway Administration which contributed $475 million, and several other banks that funded $686 million.

Despite the fact that the partner companies (Cintra and Zachary) are defaulting on debt, the chairman for the SH 130 (130 Toll) Concession Company reiterated that in time the project would, "prove a wise investment as drivers look for an alternative to Interstate 35."  Even though traffic volume has been low on SH130 Krier (Chairman for the SH 130 Concession Company) went on to state that the company, "...is pretty confident that in the long term, this is going to be a huge transportation asset for the region."

TxDOT is in favor of the toll roads, claiming that it simply does not have the funds to provide the anticipated service requirements of the Texas populace. Phil Russell, director of TxDOT's Texas Turnpike Authority Division, said in a statement, “We simply can’t continue to rely on the gas tax as our sole source of highway funding. In fact, projections are that the state gas tax would need to be raised 600 percent to meet our transportation needs over the next 25 years. Texans tell us that they want relief from traffic congestion now, not later. Toll roads allow us to build roads sooner.” 

In Texas the backlash against Toll Roads has culminated in several organizations including the Texas Toll Lawsuit website where approximately 10,000 Texans are building a class action lawsuit against the state. Another organization performing similar activities is Texans United for Reform & Freedom. The purpose of these organizations is to combat what they claim as egregious tolling fines and illegal/immoral practices by the toll road authorities.

Moratorium
Due to the enduring controversy over the future of Texas toll roads, the state legislature overwhelmingly passed a moratorium on all new toll roads in Texas in 2007. The moratorium effectively banned all new proposals for toll roads for two years, until 2009. However, this moratorium was deemed the "Swiss cheese moratorium," as it had a multitude of exemptions placed in it. Specifically, the exemptions allowed almost all the projects in the North Texas/Dallas regions to go forward. The primary concern leading to the moratorium was that the state was hurting taxpayers in the long run by deviating from its tollway authority model and contracting out roads entirely to private companies. Many legislators saw this as problematic, as the primary function of these toll roads would not be to serve the public but to serve as an instrument of profit for private corporations. These companies could raise tolls to whatever the market could bear with little or virtually no public input, and the tolls would continue long after the construction costs were paid for.

Operating agencies

State-operated toll roads

The Toll Operations Division of the Texas Department of Transportation (TxDOT) operates the Central Texas Turnpike System (CTTS) as well as other toll roads around the state. TxDOT established the Grand Parkway Transportation Corporation for the purpose of developing the Grand Parkway toll project, a portion of which is now open.

Regional tollway authorities
Regional tollway authorities are political subdivisions of the state established by two or more counties. The North Texas Tollway Authority (NTTA) is the only regional tollway authority.  NTTA operates all toll roads in the Dallas–Fort Worth Metroplex.  NTTA provides tolling services for the managed lanes in the region, but does not own or operate any managed lanes.

County toll road authorities
County toll road authorities (TRAs) are established by single counties. A county toll road authority is a division of the county in which it is established.

Regional mobility authorities

In 2001, the State Legislature authorized the creation of the regional mobility authorities (RMAs). These authorities are designed as a means for individual or multiple counties to build, operate, and maintain local toll roads or other transportation projects. These authorities are authorized to issue bonds as well as designate local revenue sources to pay for the initial costs of the projects. The primary purpose for creating the RMAs was to reduce the time and bureaucratic "red tape" in the toll road building process.

Airport toll roads
The Dallas/Fort Worth International Airport operates International Parkway as a toll road.

Privately managed toll roads
Sections 5 and 6 of State Highway 130 extend from SH 45 to I-10.  The highway is owned by the State of Texas and is operated by the SH 130 Concession Company.

Motor assistance programs
The Central Texas Regional Mobility Authority has provided a program to assist disabled drivers.  The HERO Program, is a combined effort of "the Central Texas Regional Mobility Authority, in partnership with the Texas Department of Transportation, operates the Highway Emergency Response Operator (HERO) Program—a free roadside assistance program that provides aid to stranded motorists, minimizes traffic congestion and improves highway safety along Interstate 35 in Central Texas... The program is being paid for through a combination of federal and state funds, and it costs roughly $2.3 million a year to provide the service."  The Houston area has a similar Motor Assistance Program (M.A.P.) operated by a partnership with Houston's METRO, Texas Department of Transportation, Harris County Sheriff's Department, Houston Automobile Dealers Association, Verizon Wireless and Houston TranStar

Operational costs
The cost of operating and maintaining the roadways used by commuters is quite costly.  Not all costs are considered when the need for a road is required in a geographic area. Financing tolls collected help the end be reached.  The Central Texas Regional Mobility Authority is charged with the management and construction of toll ways in central Texas.  According to the CTRMA's Financial/Investor Information information page, "The Mobility Authority uses innovative financial strategies to expedite the funding of needed transportation projects. Our nationally recognized, award-winning approach is using a mix of toll revenue bonds, government loans, toll equity grants, right-of-way donations and other funding sources to develop a transportation network that will help address the region's growing congestion problems."
Detailed earnings and investment statements are available for each road under the CTRMA's authority.
Use of funds generated by the commuters in central Texas are explained here, as well.  One use/benefit of the toll system is the HERO Program.

List

See also

References